Upper Bagh Devi Temple is an ancient shrine at Kulada, Ganjam District in the state of Odisha in India. The temple is about 8 km from Bhanjanagar, 102 km from Chhatrapur and 140 km from Bhubaneswar. The nearest railway station is at Berhampur, 88 km away.

Temple
The presiding deity of the temple is Goddess Bagh Devi.  This hilltop temple is accessed by 285 (approx) steps. Another shrine of Goddess Bagh Devi has been built at the foot of the hill.

It's people's belief that there were three sisters (including Upper Bagh Devi). One is more upper of current Upper Bagh Devi Temple is also called as Bada Raula (may be means big sister) and there is another temple simply called as Bagh Devi (youngest sister) near to Jagannath Temple. People say that these three sisters always fought each other for Coconut and then once decided that they can divide the region who will stay where. So they throw three Lotta (type of rounded drinking container widely used in Orissa for drinking water). One stuck in the same place where Bada Raula is staying currently, second one stuck in the place where today called as Upper Bagh Devi and the third one was fallen into a Pond which currently a temple which is below the ground level. Then Kavi Samrat Upendra Bhanja got indication from devi (through dream) that he may need to build temple in these places. Gradually the temple were built and renovated but the Bada Raula's Temple was never built since it is very difficult to go there as there is no steps to go there till now.

The temple celebrates the Sankranti day of every month. Thakurani Yatra, celebrated every three years, and Rath Yatra are also held in grand manner.

A temple dedicated to Lord Jagannath, Mausi Maa Temple, and Ratneswar Mahadev temple are nearby places of worship.

Beautiful temple, nearest town Bhanjanagar, Ganjam, 761126,

The temple is about 8 km from Bhanjanagar

External links
 Upper Bagh Devi Temple

Hindu temples in Ganjam district